The Men's 4 × 100 metre medley relay event at the 2010 Commonwealth Games took place on 9 October 2010, at the SPM Swimming Pool Complex.

Two heats were held, with containing nine countries. The heat in which a country competed in did not formally matter for advancement, as the countries with the top eight times from the entire field qualified for the finals.

Heats

Heat 1

Heat 2

Final

References

Aquatics at the 2010 Commonwealth Games